SM UB-122 was a German Type UB III submarine or U-boat in the German Imperial Navy during World War I. She was commissioned into the German Imperial Navy on 4 March 1918 as SM UB-122.

UB-122 was surrendered to the Allies at Harwich on 20 November 1918 in accordance with the requirements of the Armistice with Germany. Having been exhibited at Southampton in December 1918, she was then laid up at Portsmouth until scuttled in the English Channel on 1 July 1921.

Although contemporary Admiralty documents leave no room for doubt as to UB-122'''s fate, her name has become widely associated with one of three submarine-wrecks in the Medway, which another Admiralty document makes clear can only be one of UB-144, UB-145 or UB-150.

Construction

She was built by AG Weser of Bremen and following just under a year of construction, launched at Bremen on 4 March 1918. UB-122 was commissioned later the same year under the command of Oblt.z.S. Alexander Magnus. Like all Type UB III submarines, UB-122 carried 10 torpedoes and was armed with a  deck gun. UB-122'' had a displacement of  while surfaced and  when submerged. Her engines enabled her to travel at  when surfaced and  when submerged.

References

Notes

Citations

Bibliography 

 

German Type UB III submarines
World War I submarines of Germany
U-boats commissioned in 1918
1918 ships
Ships built in Bremen (state)
Maritime incidents in 1921
Shipwrecks in rivers